Guy Serge Edoa (born 14 June 1997) is a Cameroonian footballer playing with FK Radnički Pirot in Serbian First League.

Career
Born in Yaoundé, he played with Rainbow Bamenda, Tacoma Defiance and Dragon Yaoundé, before joining FK Radnički Pirot and debuting in Serbian First League.

References

1997 births
Living people
Footballers from Yaoundé
Cameroonian footballers
Cameroonian expatriate footballers
Association football midfielders
Tacoma Defiance players
USL Championship players
Expatriate soccer players in the United States
FK Radnički Pirot players
Serbian First League players
Expatriate footballers in Serbia